Mikel Labaka Zurriarain (born 10 August 1980) is a Spanish former footballer who played as a central defender, and is the assistant manager of Real Sociedad.

He amassed La Liga totals of 111 matches and five goals over six seasons, representing in the competition Real Sociedad and Rayo Vallecano. He added 111 games and eight goals in Segunda División, in a 14-year professional career.

Club career
Born in Azpeitia, Basque Country, Labaka reached Real Sociedad's youth system at the age of 17. After playing three years with the reserves he made his professional debut with Real Unión (Segunda División B) and Ciudad de Murcia (Segunda División), spending one season with each club on loan.

On 24 October 2004, Labaka made his first-team – and La Liga – debut with Real Sociedad, in a 2–1 home win against RCD Mallorca, and finished his first season with 30 games and three goals to help the Txuriurdin finish in 14th position. He only appeared in 11 league matches in 2006–07 as they suffered relegation for the first time in 40 years, but regained first-choice status the following campaigns.

In August 2011, the 31-year-old Labaka was deemed surplus to requirements by new manager Philippe Montanier, and left Real to sign for Rayo Vallecano, recently promoted to the top level. He retired in June 2013, after two seasons as a backup.

Labaka was named assistant coach at his main club on 7 June 2016, after nearly two years in the same capacity with the B side.

References

External links

1980 births
Living people
People from Azpeitia
Spanish footballers
Footballers from the Basque Country (autonomous community)
Association football defenders
La Liga players
Segunda División players
Segunda División B players
Tercera División players
Real Sociedad B footballers
Real Sociedad footballers
Real Unión footballers
Ciudad de Murcia footballers
Rayo Vallecano players
Basque Country international footballers
Real Sociedad non-playing staff
Association football coaches